G. & C. Merriam Co. v. Syndicate Pub. Co., 237 U.S. 618 (1915), was a United States Supreme Court case in which the Court held that, under the Trademark Act of 1881, after a copyrighted work expires, the word used to designate that work falls into the public domain and cannot be trademarked.

References

External links
 

1915 in United States case law
United States Supreme Court cases
United States Supreme Court cases of the White Court
United States copyright case law
United States trademark case law